FC Nyva-2 Vinnytsia was a Ukrainian football team based in Vinnytsia, Ukraine. The club has been featured regularly in the Ukrainian Second Division it serves as a junior team for the FC Nyva Vinnytsia franchise. Like most tributary teams, the best players are sent up to the senior team, meanwhile developing other players for further call-ups.

FC Nyva Vinnytsia
Nyva-2 Vinnytsia
Association football clubs established in 1999
Association football clubs disestablished in 2006
1999 establishments in Ukraine
2006 disestablishments in Ukraine
Nyva-2 Vinnytsia